Adrienne Kress is a Canadian author and actress.

Career
Adrienne Kress is the author of the internationally published and award-winning children's novels Alex and the Ironic Gentleman (Selected by the New York Post as one of its post Harry Potter reading suggestions) and Timothy and the Dragon's Gate (Scholastic), as well as the Young Adult novels, The Friday Society (Penguin) and Outcast (Diversion Books).

In 2016 and 2017 she released two new Middle Grade novels, each the first in an upcoming series: The Explorers: The Door in the Alley (Random House) and Hatter Madigan: Ghost in the H.A.T.B.O.X., the latter in collaboration with The New York Times bestselling author Frank Beddor (set in the same world as his Looking Glass Wars trilogy).

Hatter Madigan: Ghost in the H.A.T.B.O.X. was announced on The View with Adrienne cosplaying as Alyss Heart, one of the series' protagonists, along with Whoopie Goldberg who supported the Kickstarter campaign for the creation of a Looking Glass Wars graphic novel and bought a reward to have the character The Queen of Clubs in the book series based on her.

Also in 2016, her essay appeared alongside Margaret Atwood and Mariko Tamaki in the non-fiction anthology The Secret Loves Of Geek Girls (Bedside Press).

Spring 2018 will see the release of the second book in The Explorers series: The Reckless Rescue.

Adrienne has also been featured on InnerSPACE for her work incorporating the martial art of Bartitsu made famous by Arthur Conan Doyle into The Friday Society.

Film Adaptations 
According to Variety and The Hollywood Reporter, the film rights to Alex and the Ironic Gentleman have been bought by The Weinstein Company.

According to Variety and Quill and Quire, Disney is adapting The Explorers with Academy Award Nominee Michael De Luca attached as producer.

Awards
Alex and the Ironic Gentleman won the Heart of Hawick Children's Book Award in the UK and was nominated for the Red Cedar in Canada.
Timothy and the Dragon's Gate was nominated for the Audie (USA) and the Manitoba Young Readers Choice Award (Canada).

Bibliography

Novels
 Kress, Adrienne. The Friday Society (Dial Penguin [Razorbill Canada] 2012)
 Kress, Adrienne. Outcast (Diversion Books, 2013)
 Kress, Adrienne. Hatter Madigan: Ghost in the H.A.T.B.O.X. (Automatic Publishing, 2016)

The Explorers series
Kress, Adrienne. The Explorers: The Door in the Alley (Delacorte Random House, 2017)
Kress, Adrienne. The Explorers: The Reckless Rescue (Delacorte Random House, 2018)
Kress, Adrienne. The Explorers: The Quest for the Kid (Delacorte Random House, 2019)

Bendy and the Ink Machine series
 Kress, Adrienne. Bendy and the Ink Machine: Dreams Come To Life (Scholastic, 2019)
 Kress, Adrienne. Bendy: The Illusion of Living (Scholastic, 2021)
 Kress, Adrienne. Bendy and the Ink Machine: The Lost Ones (Scholastic, 2021)

Alex and the Ironic Gentleman series
 Kress, Adrienne. Alex and the Ironic Gentleman (Weinstein Books [Scholastic UK/Canada] 2007)
 Kress, Adrienne. Timothy and the Dragon's Gate (Weinstein Books [Scholastic UK/Canada] 2008)

Short fiction 
Kress, Adrienne. "The Clockwork Corset", Corsets & Clockwork: 13 Steampunk Romances [edited by Trisha Telep] (Running Press Kids, 2011)

Non-Fiction 
 Kress, Adrienne. "The Inevitable Decline of Decadence", The Girl Who Was on Fire - Movie Edition [edited by Leah Wilson] (Smart Pop Books, 2012)
 Kress, Adrienne. "The Emergence of YA", The Complete Guide to Writing for Young Adults [edited by Gabrielle Harbowy] (Dragon Moon Press, 2014)
 Kress, Adrienne. "I'm Your Biggest Fan", The Secret Loves Of Geek Girls [edited by Hope Nicholson] (Bedside Press, 2016)

References

External links

 Official Website
 Goodreads Page
 Amazon Page
 

Canadian writers of young adult literature
Steampunk writers
Canadian children's writers
Living people
Writers from Toronto
Year of birth missing (living people)